The TriMet transit system, serving the Portland metropolitan area in Oregon, owns and operates two different rail transit systems:  a light rail system known as MAX and a commuter rail system known as WES.  The fleet of 145 MAX light rail vehicles (LRVs) includes five different models, designated by TriMet as "Type 1" through "Type 5", all of which are used on all of the MAX lines.  "Type  6" cars are on order and are due to replace the Type 1 cars in 2023–2024.  The comparatively very small WES fleet includes three different types of commuter rail cars.

Light rail fleet 

Notes on capacities:
The capacities given are for a single car; a two-car train has double the capacity.
The Type 2 cars originally had 72 seats, but eight seats were later removed, to make space for bicycles.
All of these capacity figures are based on "normal" loading conditions (defined as 4 standing passengers per square meter by industry standards); under so-called "crush" loading conditions (6-8 standees per m2), all of these cars are capable of carrying many more passengers than stated here.

Type 1 

The Type 1 cars were manufactured by a joint venture between Bombardier Corporation and La Brugeoise et Nivelles (BN; Bombardier would later acquire the company) and featured a raised floor with steps at the doors. TriMet had wanted to contract American firm Budd Corporation, but the company backed out at the last minute. TriMet announced it would purchase an additional seven vehicles in August 1983, but a budget shortfall forced the agency to withdraw this proposal the following November. The cars were built, with some modifications for Portland, to a BN design that had previously been usedunder license by Brazilian manufacturer Cobrasma(PT)for 68 rail cars for Rio de Janeiro. The electrical propulsion equipment was supplied by Brown, Boveri & Company. Bombardier built the frames in Quebec, but its factory in Barre, Vermont, manufactured the majority of each car, with 80 percent of the production and assembly taking place in Barre. The first vehicle was completed at the factory in late 1983 and arrived in Portland in 1984. The Type 1 cars are the only light rail cars in TriMet's fleet that lack regenerative braking capability, as all cars purchased later had such capability.

The Type 1 cars were delivered without air-conditioning, but it was added to all cars during a retrofit in 1997–98. These cars were originally equipped with stop-request bell cords (as are commonly found on American transit buses), which passengers needed to pull to signal the operator that they wanted to get off at the next stop. However, they were removed in 1994 after TriMet adopted an operating practice of having MAX trains stop at every station at all times. The bodies of the Type 1 vehicles include cutaway areas by each truck, for maintenance access. In 1995, TriMet began installing wheel skirts to cover these, to reduce noise, and said that these would be included on all LRVs purchased in the future.

For their first 30 years (until 2016) the Type 1 cars had roll-type, printed destination signs. The Type 1 cars were the only MAX cars whose rollsigns were hand-cranked. Because of the time-consuming process to change the signs, only the sign on the exposed end of the car in a two-car train was changed to the correct destination. The side signs only listed the designated route color (such as "Blue Line") rather than a destination, and the sign on the coupled end of each car in a two-car train was left blank. A two-year program that began in October 2014 and was completed in September 2016 gradually replaced all of the rollsigns in the Type 1 cars (as well as those in the Types 2 and 3) with digital, LED-type destination signs.

Starting in 2003, TriMet began a program to refurbish the bodies of the Type 1 cars, carried out by its own employees. Known as the Body Overhaul program, it included extensive body renovation, replacement of all windows, repainting into the new paint scheme the agency adopted in 2002, and minor interior refurbishment, but not any work on the cars' mechanical or propulsion equipment. The program proceeded at a slower pace than originally anticipated because of staffing issues, with only two cars being worked on at a time, and each taking one to two years. By 2018, when only 23 of the 26 cars had been completed, TriMet had  terminated the program because, by that time, the Type 1 fleet was only a few years away from retirement. The last overhauled car, No. 112, returned to service in April 2018. The three cars that never received the body overhaul and repainting were Nos. 102, 103 and 116.

In February 2018, TriMet announced its intention to purchase replacements for all 26 Type 1 cars. In July  2019, TriMet did place such an order, for 26 new cars which it has designated Type 6 (see below).

Type 2 

With the partial opening of Westside MAX in 1997, TriMet's "Type 2" light rail vehicles were introduced. The Siemens model SD660 (originally SD600, but retroactively redesignated SD660 in 1998) have a low-floor design, a first for light rail vehicles in North America, digital readerboards and a slightly more open floor plan. The floor is nearly level with the platforms, and small ramps called "bridge plates" extend (on request) from two of the four doors, enabling passengers in wheelchairs to roll on and off of the vehicle easily.  These permitted the elimination of wheelchair lifts that had been located at every station and were time-consuming to use. High-floor Type 1 cars are now always paired with a low-floor Type 2 or 3 car so that each train is wheelchair-accessible.

The first low-floor light rail vehicle was delivered in 1996 and first used in service on August 31, 1997. The new vehicles also came equipped with air-conditioning, a feature originally lacking from the Type 1 vehicles. The initial order of 39 Type 2 vehicles was expanded, in stages, to a total of 52 vehicles.

Some of the later models of light rail vehicles had automatic passenger counters retrofitted; in these models, they are on the floor of the doorways.

In 2001–02, TriMet modified the interior of the Type 2 cars to add space for bicycles. Eight seats per vehicle were removed and replaced—in four places per car—with hooks from which a bicycle can be hung.  All later cars have been delivered from the manufacturer with these bike hooks already installed.  In 2014–2016, the rollsign-type destination signs in these cars and the almost-identical Type 3 cars were gradually replaced with digital signs in a two-year conversion program.

Type 3 

The second series of Siemens SD660 cars, TriMet's "Type 3" MAX light rail vehicle, are outwardly identical to the Type 2 cars in design, the primary difference being various technical upgrades. Siemens installed an improved air-conditioning system, more ergonomic seats and automatic passenger counters using photoelectric sensors above the doorways. The Type 3 cars were the first to wear the transit agency's newer (2002-adopted) paint scheme. Purchased for the opening of the Yellow Line in May 2004, delivery of the Type 3 series began in February 2003, and the vehicles began to enter service in September 2003.

Type 4 

Twenty-two new Siemens S70 low-floor cars, designated Type 4, were purchased in conjunction with the I-205 and Portland Mall MAX projects. They feature a more streamlined design than previous models, have more seating and are lighter in weight and therefore more energy-efficient. They can only operate in pairs, since each car has just one operator's cab, at the "A" end (the "B" end has additional passenger seating). The Type 4 MAX cars began to enter service in August 2009.

The Type 4 cars were the first to use LED-type destination signs. On the rollsign-type destination signs useduntil 2016on the Type 1, 2 and 3 cars the designated route color (blue, green, red, or yellow) was shown as a colored background under white or black text, while in the LED signs the route color is indicated by a colored square at the left end of the display, and all text is orange lettering against a black background. In October 2014, TriMet began a two-year program to gradually replace all rollsigns in its MAX fleet with LED signs, affecting a total of 105 cars (and four signs per car).  The conversion program was completed in September 2016 (with the last use of a rollsign in service being on August 19).

Type 5 

The second series of Siemens S70 cars, TriMet's "Type 5" MAX vehicle, were purchased in conjunction with the Portland–Milwaukie (MAX Orange Line) project, but are used on all lines in the system. These vehicles include some improvements over the Type 4 cars, including a less-cramped interior seating layout and improvements to the air-conditioning system and wheelchair ramps. TriMet placed the order for the Type 5 cars with Siemens in April 2012 and they began to be delivered in September 2014. The first two cars entered service on April 27, 2015, and all but the last two had entered service by the time the Orange Line opened in September 2015. The fleet numbers for the Type 5 cars are 521–538 (at the time the first cars were built, fleet numbers 511–514 were in use for the Vintage Trolley cars).  In 2020, Siemens retroactively rebranded TriMet's Type 5 cars as model S700 instead of S70.

Type 6 (on order) 

Ordered in 2019 as replacements for the Type 1 cars, TriMet's Type 6 will be Siemens model S700 (the S700 is a 2019 redesignation by Siemens of the version of its S70 model that resulted from a 2013 redesign of the center truck, of which TriMet's Type 5 cars were the first built by Siemens). The initial order, finalized in July 2019, was for 26 cars, but the contract includes options for additional cars, for service expansion and the proposed Southwest Corridor MAX line, if built. Although identical to the Type 5 cars in most respects, the Type 6 will have operating cabs at both ends, and will wear a new paint scheme that TriMet introduced on its bus fleet in early 2019: overall blue with orange stripes. The first car is expected to arrive around spring 2022 and the last of the initial 26 in mid-2023. The order was increased to 30 cars in June 2021. Car 601 arrived at Ruby Junction Yard in December of 2022 and will go into burn-in testing once the 2nd car is delivered at a later date.

Ice-cutting pantographs 
After a January 2004 Portland-area snow and ice storm that shut down the entire two-line MAX system for a day and a half, TriMet decided to install second, ice-cutting pantographs on some Type 1 light rail vehicles, which it would run (empty) all night under certain weather conditions, to prevent ice from building up on the overhead lines. Unlike the regular pantographs, these "ice cutters" do not draw power from the overhead wire, but instead are fitted with a head designed to scrape ice off of the wire. Six cars (Nos. 107–112) were equipped in 2006, and a seventh (113) in early 2018. In early 2019, TriMet installed ice-cutting pantographs on all 18 of its Type 5 cars. On the Type 5 cars, the ice-cutting pantographs are located near the outer end of each car, near the operating cab. The 26 Type 6 cars that were ordered in 2019 and are due for delivery in 2022–2023 will also be equipped with second pantographs for ice cutting.

Commuter rail fleet 
The commuter rail line between Beaverton and Wilsonville is operated primarily with trains made up from a fleet of four Colorado Railcar Aero diesel multiple unit railcars. TriMet also owns four Budd RDC diesel multiple-unit railcars, of which two have entered service and are used as a backup.

See also 
Portland Vintage Trolley

Explanatory notes

References 

Electric multiple units of the United States
Rolling Stock
Passenger rail transportation in Oregon
Rolling Stock